Zhejiang Tailong Commercial Bank (TLB) (Pinyin: Zhèjiāng Tàilóng Shāngyè Yínháng), one of several SME financing service providers, is headquartered in Taizhou, Zhejiang Province, Eastern China. Since its inception, the bank has cumulatively provided over ¥150 billion (around $23 billion) loans with average loan size of ¥500,000 to its clientele, and over 90% of which are peasants-turned entrepreneurs. As its clientele often lacks the assets required by larger banks when applying for a loan, TLB grants and disburses loans secured through guarantors, which collateral form accounts for 99% of the total loans outstanding. In addition to that, the number of loan officers is almost half of the total staff, due to the labor-intensive nature of SME lending business. By the end of December 2011, TLB had eight branches, two village and town banks and 50 sub-branches which are mainly spread out around the Yangtze River Delta region.

History
It was founded in 1993 with a registered capital of RMB 1 million and 7 staff, positioning itself at the very beginning as the small-and-micro-enterprise(SME) financing service provider and being upgraded from credit union to commercial bank in 2006, is one of few complete private holding city commercial banks in China. Although the credit union was performing adequately in the first half decade since its birth, it was struggling in the fiercely competitive Chinese market. As a result, the bank focusses its market strategy on small and mid-sized business.

By the end of December 2011, TLB had RMB 39 billion of deposit balance and RMB 26 billion of outstanding loans with NPL ratio of 0.58%, thereof SME loans took up more than 90%. When starting operations in 1993, the bank did not have many other choices than going into the niche of SME.

Business
TLB has a strongly decentralized structure and delegates many authorities to the branches and sub-branches. Approximately more than 80% of all loan decisions can be made at sub-branch level.

Although TLB was performing adequately in the inception phase, it was struggling in the fiercely competitive Chinese market. As a result, the bank developed and provided some distinct and unique products to SMEs. as regards SME’s lack of collaterals required by bigger banks, TLB serves them special loans secured only through guarantors to attract more clients. Up to now, this kind of loans take up more than 90% of total loans outstanding in terms of volume and 99% in terms of number of clients.

See also
List of banks
List of banks in China

References

Banks of China
Companies based in Zhejiang
Software companies of China
Banks established in 1993
Privately held companies of China